Rhagium elmaliense is a species of beetle in the family Cerambycidae. It was described by Schmid in 1999.

References

Lepturinae
Beetles described in 1999